The Argen is a river in Baden-Württemberg, Germany. It flows into Lake Constance between Kressbronn am Bodensee and Langenargen as the third largest tributary to the lake.

Course 
The headwaters of the Argen arise in the Allgäu.  There are two headwaters: the Obere Argen and the Untere Argen.  The two arms wrap around the Große Kreisstadt of Wangen im Allgäu and meet each other in the Neuravensburg district of Wangen im Allgäu.

Untere Argen 
From the confluence, it first flows north to Isny im Allgäu, then northwest to Waltershofen, then southwest to Primisweiler. Past Primisweiler, it merges with the Obere Argen.

The main tributaries are the Wengener Argen and the Haslach.

The Federal highway A96 crosses it a number of times.

Obere Argen 
The Obere Argen originates in a marshy area north-west of Oberstaufen in the Allgäu. It initially flows through the Eistobel gorge, then underneath the Argentobelbrücke, and past Grünenbach towards Wangen im Allgäu.  From there it flows on via Neuravensburg to Pflegelberg, where it is united with the Untere Argen.

Lower reaches 

Geomorphologically, the Argen has cut a deep and wide valley into the landscape, leading to such place names as Gitzensteig. In some places, the valley is over a kilometre wide.

Further down its course, the river bed becomes increasingly broader.   The river here flows past the villages of Laimnau, Apflau and Badhütten.  In the lower part of its course, the Argen was straightened out considerably. It no longer has oxbow lakes because of the intensive valley agriculture.  In recent years the massive concrete walls alongside the river have been replaced with large boulders in most of the shallower zones.  Near the estuary at Kressbronn, gravel is mined in larger quantities, creating new lakes along the river.

Ruins 
The ruins of several castles and palaces flank the lower reaches of the Argen: Altsummerau, Neusummerau, the late medieval Gießen Castle at Kreisbrunn, Achberg Castle and Neuravensburg Castle.  Remains of an ancient hill fort can be found in the woods above the river.

Mouth 
The mouth into Lake Constance is flanked on both sides by small harbours for pleasure boats. On the left is a camping grounds name Gohren. There is another camping grounds with restaurant at Laimnau. To prevent flooding, several protective walls have been constructed along the river.

Kayaking is possible; bathing facilities are available.

Level 

It is operated by the "Flood Forecasting Centre Baden-Württemberg,"  the "State Institute for Environment, Measurements and Nature Conservation Baden-Württemberg," and by the Regierungsbezirk Tübingen.

Statistical values 
 Mean lowest water level 1980–2003: , 
 Average water level in the years 1980–2003: , 
 Historical record levels, flooding on 22 May 1999:

Nature reserve 

An area of approximately  flanking the Argen was declared a nature reserve by the regional council of Tübingen on 16 December 1997. Its official name is Naturschutzgebiet Argen and it is registered as reserve number 4282. The reserve covers the area between the confluence of the Obere and Untere Argen and the mouth into Lake Constance. It includes the river, steep slopes, floodplain forest and swamp forests, valleys and flood embankments.

History 
In Alamannia, a Carolingian county named Argungowe (i.e. Argen County) was recorded from the end of the 8th century.

Marathon 
The roads along the Argen between Argensteg and Gießenbrücke are used in the annual Bodensee-Marathon.  Runners must run on the road on the Kressbronn side to Gießenbrücke, cross the bridge and run along the river on the Langenargen side to Argensteg, then via Gohren to the finish at Kressbronn Lakeside Sports Hall.

Gallery

References and sources 
 Norbert Kruse: Die Argen und ihre Namen, in: Im Oberland, issue 2, 2002, pp. 55–64.
 .

References

External links 

 Pictures around the Argen
 Data from the level measuring station below Gießen Bridge
 Vibrational modes of the suspension bridge over the Argen at Achberg

Rivers of Baden-Württemberg
Rivers of Germany